Cwengile Dumisani Thando 'JD' Jadezweni (born 2 October 1986 in Stellenbosch, South Africa) is a rugby referee on the National A Panel of the South African Rugby Union.

He also works as a rugby analyst at Sound Sure, along with fellow referee Marius van der Westhuizen.

Career

Jadezweni attended Parel Vallei High School in Somerset West before returning to his town of birth to study sports science at the University of Stellenbosch. He was named on South African Rugby Referees' Association's Contenders Panel in 2011 and to their National Panel in 2012.

He took charge of a number of matches in the 2012 Under-18 Craven Week tournament in Port Elizabeth, as well as some 2012 Under-19 Provincial Championship matches. He made his first class debut in 2013, when he was appointed the referee for the  versus  match in Potchefstroom during the 2013 Vodacom Cup, before again refereeing at youth level later in the year.

He took charge of some 2014 Varsity Cup and Varsity Shield matches and was appointed to co-referee the final with Marius van der Westhuizen.

Jadeweni was promoted to the South African Rugby Referees' Association's Elite Panel for 2016, before being named on the refereeing panel for the 2016 World Rugby Under 20 Championship held in England.

References

Living people
South African rugby union referees
SARU referees
Currie Cup referees
1986 births
People from Stellenbosch
Super Rugby referees
Sportspeople from the Western Cape